Sometimes the Magic is an album by saxophonist Jane Ira Bloom which was recorded in 2000 and released on the Arabesque label the following year.

Reception

The AllMusic review by Glenn Astarita said "Jane Ira Bloom looms as one of the most important soprano saxophonists in modern jazz. Armed with a distinctive tone and a proclivity to execute serpentine lines amid various tremolo and vibrato techniques, the artist also reaps the benefits of a topnotch rhythm section on this 2001 release". On All About Jazz, Jim Santella stated "Most of the session allows for the passing of creative ideas back and forth between the four artists, keeping the mood quiet and making room for quiet contemplation. Bloom's gorgeous saxophone tone and unique method of presentation makes this and her live performances a special treat" Jeff Simon of The Buffalo News added, "With the sonorous Mark Dresser on bass and Vincent Bourgey replacing Fred Hersch on piano, this is a group that, if it played anywhere locally, would be worth braving rain, sleet, snow and dead of night to hear. They are, on record, as impressive as can be and a constant surprise."

Track listing
All compositions by Jane Ira Bloom except where noted
 "Denver Snap" – 5:08
 "Now You See It" – 5:23
 "Bewitched, Bothered and Bewildered" (Richard Rodgers, Lorenz Hart) – 3:03
 "Blue Poles" – 5:45
 "Pacific" – 4:53
 "Truth in Timbre" – 5:28
 "Without Words" – 4:36
 "In Everything" – 4:20
 "Varo" – 5:26
 "Many Landscapes" – 4:19
 "How Are Things in Glocca Morra?" (Burton Lane, Yip Harburg) – 3:50

Personnel
Jane Ira Bloom – soprano saxophone, live electronics
Vincent Bourgeyx – piano
Mark Dresser – double bass 
Bobby Previte – drums

References

External links

Arabesque Records albums
Jane Ira Bloom albums
2001 albums